Ockenden may refer to:

Ockenden International, a charity
Ockenden, California, U.S.
Donna Ockenden, Senior British midwife and chair of the Ockenden Review
Eddie Ockenden (born 1987), Australian hockey player
Hilary Ockendon (fl. 1986–2015), British mathematician
John Ockendon (born c. 1940), British mathematician
Leon Ockenden (born 1978), English actor

See also
Ockendon (disambiguation)